Łoś  is a village in the administrative district of Gmina Prażmów, within Piaseczno County, Masovian Voivodeship, in east-central Poland.

The village has a population of 370.

References

Kampinoski Park Narodowy

Villages in Piaseczno County